Paracentrotus is a genus of sea urchin in the family Parechinidae described in 1903 by Mortensen.

List of Species

References

External links

Parechinidae